St Anselm's Church in Southall is a Roman Catholic parish church served by the Society of Jesus in the London Borough of Ealing within the administration of the Archdiocese of Westminster. It is situated on The Green, a main thoroughfare into Southall. The parish was home to the De Nobili Dialogue Centre; a Jesuit building for inter-religious dialogue. It is also the only Catholic church in Southall and the parish has more than fifty nationalities represented in the congregation.

History
From 1906, when the parish began, to the present church, St Anselm's has been in three different church buildings. The first St Anselm's church in Southall began in 1906. It was situated in a tithe barn of Southall Manor House. It remained there until 1920, when a new building was opened.

This building was in two halves. One half was the church, the other was a hall that housed a small mixed junior school. As the size of the school increased, in 1930, a new church was opened. This was built beside the school and was a long, low, brick building with a separate small wooden bell tower. Nevertheless, the school again needed to be enlarged. So in 1968, the church moved to its present location and the old church became the school hall. From 2001, priests from the Society of Jesus have been serving the parish.

Parish

Groups
The church hosts many parish groups including a local justice and peace society that meet to discuss issues and promote social justice activities in the area. The church is also involved with the West London branch of Citizens UK. Also, resident in the parish is a community of the Missionaries of Charity who work with the poor in the area.

School
The parish enjoys a close relationship with the nearby St Anselm's Catholic Primary School. Different school year groups celebrate Mass each term and they also have regular Masses which are celebrated by the whole school throughout the year.

De Nobili Dialogue Centre
Within the parish and working closely with the church was the De Nobili Dialogue Centre. It was a Jesuit centre for inter-religious dialogue. It was named after Roberto de Nobili an Italian Jesuit missionary who went to India in the 17th century and adopted many of the local customs to get his Christian message accepted there. It provided a space in multi-cultural Southall for different faiths to meet in prayer and dialogue. It was also associated with the Centre for Christianity and Interreligious Dialogue at Heythrop College, University of London.

See also
 List of Jesuit sites in the United Kingdom
 List of Catholic churches in the United Kingdom

References

External links

20th-century Roman Catholic church buildings in the United Kingdom
Churches in the Roman Catholic Diocese of Westminster
Jesuit churches in the United Kingdom
Roman Catholic churches completed in 1968
Roman Catholic churches in the London Borough of Ealing
Saint Anselm